AIG is American International Group, a major American insurance corporation.

AIG or AiG may also refer to:

 And-inverter graph, a concept in computer theory
 Answers in Genesis, a young-earth creationist organization in the U.S.
 Arta Industrial Group in Iran
 Aigburth railway station (National Rail code) in Liverpool, England
 A.I.G. or Allah Is God, a pop duo
 Asian Indoor Games

See also
 
 
 AIG American General, a subsidiary of AIG
 Age (disambiguation)